The 2001 Pacific hurricane season was a relatively near-average Pacific hurricane season which produced sixteen named storms, though most were rather weak and short-lived including one unnamed tropical storm which was operationally recognized as a tropical depression, the first such occurrence since 1996. Only eight hurricanes formed and two major hurricanes. The season officially began on May 15 in the East Pacific Ocean, and on June 1 in the Central Pacific; they ended on November 30. These dates conventionally delimit the period of each year when most tropical cyclones form in the Pacific basin. However, the formation of tropical cyclones is possible at any time of the year.

The first storm of the season, Hurricane Adolph, formed on May 25 which became the strongest hurricane in the month of May at the time. Tropical Storm Barbara passed just north of Hawaii, bringing minimal impact. The most notable storm that year was Hurricane Juliette, which caused devastating floods in Baja California Peninsula. September was much more active with six systems developing, of which three became hurricanes. Activity decreased appreciably in October and November as most of the storms remained weak and short-lived. The final storm of the season, Hurricane Octave, dissipated on November 3, about twenty-seven days before the official end of the season. Overall, this season was drastically less active and destructive, causing about $401 million in damages and thirteen fatalities.

Seasonal summary 

The season officially began on May 15 in Eastern Pacific and on June 1 in Central Pacific; both ended on November 30. There were sixteen tropical storms in the eastern Pacific basin during the 2001 season. Of those, seven became hurricanes, of which two became major hurricanes by reaching Category 3 intensity or higher on the Saffir–Simpson hurricane wind scale (SSHS). Four tropical depressions formed and dissipated before reaching the intensity of a named storm. In the eastern Pacific proper, the season saw average activity in terms of the number of named systems, but the season also featured seven hurricanes and two major hurricanes, both totals a bit below long term averages. Overall, activity during the season was near normal. The first storm of the season, Hurricane Adolph, formed in late May, slightly ahead of schedule, and at the time was the strongest May hurricane on record. This season featured only one named storm in the month of June, followed by three in July and only one during August, including none during the first three weeks of August, a time that usually sees several storms. Activity picked up during the second half of the season, starting in September, when five named storms were observed, before decreasing to three and no storms in October and November respectively.

On average, two to three tropical storms or hurricanes hit Mexico every year on the Pacific side. However, only one tropical cyclone, Hurricane Juliette, made landfall along the coast of Mexico in 2001. In addition, Adolph, Dalila, Ivo, and Lorena came close enough to land to require tropical cyclone warnings and watches.

Systems

Hurricane Adolph 

Hurricane Adolph originated from a tropical wave that left Africa on May 7, and was poorly organized. It was not until May 18 that the storm showed some signs of development in the Atlantic Ocean. The system, after drifting a while, intensified into Tropical Storm Adolph the next day. Later, on May 27 Adolph was upgraded to a hurricane. Intensifying into a hurricane, Adolph rapidly intensified, and reached to Category 4 strength on May 28. Two days after, Adolph went under an eyewall replacement cycle, and weakened to a  hurricane, which is minimal category 3 intensity. This trend of weakening continued, and deteriorated into a tropical storm. Passing over cooler waters, and stable air, Adolph dissipated on June 1.

Tropical Storm Barbara 

A tropical wave that moved off the coast of Africa on June 1. The wave eventually entered the Pacific Ocean on June 10, though no further organization occurred until June 18. The system slowly organized further over the next two days, and became Tropical Depression Two-E early on June 20. Although the depression remained poorly organized, it was upgraded to Tropical Storm Barbara. Shortly thereafter, Barbara began encountering unfavorable conditions, such higher wind shear and cooler sea surface temperatures.

It weakened to a tropical depression at 18:00 UTC on June 26, while crossing 140°W into the Central Pacific Hurricane Center's area of responsibility. The depression passed north of the Hawaiian Islands on June 25, then weakened to an easterly wave to the northwest of Kauai on June 26. The remnants of Barbara continued west-northwest until being absorbed by a frontal zone near the International Date Line on June 30. Barbara was the first tropical cyclone in the Central Pacific during the month of June, the second being Tropical Storm Boris in 2020.

Tropical Storm Cosme 

A tropical wave crossed Central America and emerged into the eastern Pacific basin on July 6. The wave moved slowly westward from July 6 – July 10. Over the next two days, the system moved generally west-northwestward as multiple competing low-level circulations developed within the broad area of low pressure associated with it. During this period, development of the disturbance was hindered by southerly shear from an upper-level trough to the west of the disturbance that caused the system to become elongated north–south. On July 12, the upper trough cut off southwest of the disturbance and the organization improved.

The forward motion then slowed over the next 12 hours. By early on July 14, convection was limited and well removed from the center. Cosme produced no more significant convection after about on July 15, at which point the tropical cyclone became a non-convective low center.

Tropical Storm Erick 

A poorly defined tropical wave traveled westward across the tropical Atlantic and reached the eastern North Pacific on July 16. Thereafter, deep convection gradually developed around a large cyclonic gyre which accompanied the wave. It was not until July 20 that a well-defined center of circulation formed and satellite intensity estimates supported tropical depression status. It then moved over relatively cooler waters and weakened as the deep convection quickly vanished. By July 24, it was just a non-convective and dissipating swirl of low clouds, although some showers re-developed intermittently.

Hurricane Dalila 

Dalila's origin is a tropical wave that moved westward from Africa and over the eastern tropical Atlantic Ocean on July 10. It crossed northern South America and Central America on the July 15 through July 17 accompanied by vigorous thunderstorm activity, and then entered the Pacific basin on July 18 as an organized area of disturbed weather. Moving west-northwestward, it became Tropical Storm Dalila with  winds 12 hours later. The wind speed briefly reached an estimated  on July 24, and Dalila became a hurricane. However, the system quickly weakened back to a strong tropical storm. Passing directly over Socorro Island on July 25, most of the associated deep convection with Dalila dissipated on July 27 as the storm moved over colder water.

Tropical Depression Six-E 

A westward moving tropical wave entered the Pacific from August 12 to 13 after crossing from the Atlantic and Caribbean. At 12:00 UTC on August 22, Tropical Depression Six-E developed from this wave. In addition to lowering sea surface temperatures, the system began to be affected by southerly wind shear, which displaced the mid-level circulation and deep convection from the low-level circulation. The National Hurricane Center later noted the disorganized state of the tropical depression as being only "... a swirl of low clouds with a few showers to the north and northeast of the center". It became elongated, and dissipated at 06:00 UTC on August 24.

Hurricane Flossie 

A tropical wave emerged into the Atlantic Ocean on August 11 and spawned Atlantic Tropical Storm Chantal three days later. After tracking westward toward the Yucatán Peninsula, the southern portion of the tropical wave split. The southern part crossed Central American and entered the Pacific Ocean on August 21. The system initially struggled to organize; however, a closed circulation developed on August 23. The low-level circulation began to become well-defined as it moved away from Mexico on August 26, while convection consolidated near the center. Later that day, it was classified as Tropical Depression Seven-E. Under conditions very favorable for development, and after banding features increased, the system was upgraded to Tropical Storm Flossie later on August 26. By early on August 29, further intensification was not expected, but Flossie suddenly deepened to a Category 2 hurricane. Flossie weakened quickly, and weakened to a minimal hurricane 24 hours after peak intensity; the National Hurricane Center noted an ill-defined eye at the time. Early on August 30, Flossie weakened to a tropical storm. On September 1, Flossie was downgraded to a tropical depression, and after becoming devoid of deep convection, the system degenerated into a remnant low on September 2. The remnants of Flossie moved inland over Baja California, eventually entering the southwestern region of the United States and dissipating.

Flossie's remnants caused flash flooding in San Diego and Riverside counties in California, dropping  of rain in one hour. A strong downdraft knocked a tree onto a house. In addition, four people were struck by lightning, two of them fatally. The total cost of damage caused by Flossie's remnants was $35,000 (2001 USD).

Hurricane Gil 

A tropical wave emerged into the Atlantic Ocean off the coast of Africa between August 14 and August 15. The northern part of the wave developed into Tropical Storm Dean on August 22, while the remaining portion entered the Pacific on August 24. The wave organized slowly and did not develop into a tropical depression until September 4. Although outflow from Henriette was predicted to slow or prevent intensification, Gil managed to become a hurricane early on September 6. Gil curved northwestward on September 6 and began to become affected by northeasterly outflow associated with Henriette. By September 7, the storm became noticeably disorganized and weakened to a Category 1 hurricane. After weakening to a Category 1, Gil accelerated northward around the circulation of Henriette. After over a region with sea surface temperatures near , Gil rapidly weakened, and fell to tropical storm intensity six hours later. Gil continued to weaken and was downgraded to a tropical depression early on September 9.

Tropical Storm Henriette 

A tropical wave crossed over Central America between August 28 and August 29. While south of Acapulco, it began showing signs of development. Visible satellite images early on September 4 revealed a partially exposed, but well defined low-level circulation. Early on September 5, as the depression headed westward, the separation between the circulation center and the deep convection decreased. Several hours later, the depression intensified into Tropical Storm Henriette. Upper-level easterly flow, which was still evident over the cyclone early on September 6, lessened and a more favorable outflow pattern began to develop. The cyclone began weakening due to cold waters and its proximity to Gil. A Fujiwhara interaction between Henriette and Gil occurred on September 8. Henriette soon dissipated after losing its closed low-level circulation. Its remnants were absorbed by Gil.

Tropical Storm Ivo 

Ivo formed from a large tropical wave that moved off the African coast on August 26. The wave was accompanied by a large cyclonic rotation at the low to middle levels and numerous thunderstorms when it entered the eastern Atlantic. On August 28, the wave spawned a northward-moving vortex in the eastern Atlantic, but the wave's southern portion continued westward with very limited convective activity. Once the wave reached the western Caribbean Sea on September 5, the shower activity increased and the whole system continued slowly westward over Central America. The cloud pattern gradually became better organized and by September 9, satellite images showed a low to middle-level circulation centered near Acapulco, Mexico.

The center of the depression moved slowly west and west-northwestward with its circulation hugging the southwest coast of Mexico. There was moderate easterly shear over the depression as indicated by the location of the convection to the west of the center. Satellite images and a report from a ship indicated that the depression reached tropical storm status by 06:00 UTC September 11. The tropical storm moved toward the northwest and then west over increasingly cooler waters, and gradually weakened. It became a low-pressure system devoid of convection by the end of September 14.

Tropical Depression One-C 

The system moved west-northwestward to 15°N 153°W initially, and then shifted southwestward shortly thereafter. A poorly organized system, the convection of Tropical Depression One-C dissipated later on September 11, after having been a depression for only 12 hours.

Hurricane Juliette 

An area of disturbed weather associated with the remnants of Atlantic Tropical Depression Nine organized directly into Tropical Storm Juliette in the East Pacific on September 21. Moving generally northwestward under the influence of a mid-level ridge to the north, Juliette strengthened, aided by a low wind shear environment. It became a hurricane the next day, and rapidly intensified to a Category 4 hurricane on September 23. A pinhole eye appeared on the 24th, and Juliette reached peak intensity on September 25 with  winds and a minimum barometric pressure of 923 millibars. Juliette developed rare concentric eyewalls as it reached peak intensity, which persisted from September 24 to the 27th. On September 26, Juliette turned northward around a strong trough over the western United States and began to weaken. Passing just west of Cabo San Lucas on September 28 with  winds, it made landfall near San Carlos as a minimal tropical storm two days later. Juliette crossed the Baja California Peninsula into Gulf of California as a tropical depression and dissipated over the far northern part of the gulf on October 3.

Juliette dumped heavy rains on the Baja California Peninsula and in Sonora, where it caused two deaths. Its effects were especially hard on Cabo San Lucas, Baja California Sur, which was cut off from the outside world for a few days. The remnants of Juliette moved into the state of California, where they caused thunderstorms, rain, and some downed power lines. The total estimated cost of damage was $400 million (2001 USD; $  USD).

Hurricane Kiko 

A tropical wave that led to the formation of Atlantic Hurricane Felix over the eastern Atlantic on September 7 also seems to have produced Kiko. This wave moved westward at low latitudes, crossing northern South America and Central America into the East Pacific from September 13 to 16. By September 17, cloudiness and showers increased near the Gulf of Tehuantepec. The area of disturbed weather moved westward for the next few days, without much increase in organization. On September 21, the system's cloud pattern became more consolidated, and curved bands of showers were evident. Located in an environment of easterly vertical shear, the system strengthened slowly. By September 22 the organization of the cloud pattern improved, and the cyclone strengthened into Tropical Storm Kiko. Kiko turned from a northwestward to a west-northwestward heading that day. Although some easterly shear continued to affect the system, very deep convection persisted near the center, and based on Dvorak intensity estimates, Kiko strengthened into a hurricane around September 23. A little later on September 23, deep convection decreased in coverage and intensity and Hurricane Kiko weakened back to a tropical storm. The system continued to fall in intensity on September 24, in part due to the entrainment of more stable air into the circulation. Kiko weakened to a tropical depression on September 25, by which time southwesterly shear also became prevalent. The cyclone degenerated into a westward-moving swirl of low clouds with little or no deep convection later that day. Kiko's remnant low persisted and continued moving generally westward for several more days with intermittent, minor occurrences of deep convection within the circulation. It was finally absorbed into a frontal system to the northeast of the Hawaiian Islands on October 1.

Tropical Storm Two-C

Tropical Storm Two-C formed near 10°N 147.4°W on September 22, southwest of Tropical Storm Kiko (in the East Pacific). Throughout September 23, Tropical Depression Two-C remained a poorly organized system that slowly moved west-northwestward. A slight increase in convection became apparent on September 24, and was followed by a period of consistent thunderstorm activity near the circulation center as the depression continued in the west-northwest direction.

Tropical Storm Lorena 

The tropical wave that eventually developed into Lorena moved off the west coast of Africa on September 13. The poorly defined wave tracked rapidly westward across the Atlantic for more than a week. There was little or no thunderstorm activity associated with the wave until it moved across Central America on September 27. The wave possessed a well-defined closed low-level circulation at that time. Convection steadily increased and banding features developed during the day on October 1. Satellite intensity estimates indicate the system became Tropical Depression Thirteen-E at October 2. By October 4, the forward speed of Tropical Storm Lorena had decreased to around seven to nine mph (11 to 14 km/h) and strong upper-level southwesterly shear began to adversely affect the cyclone. The remnant low-level cloud circulation remained offshore and persisted for another day or so before completely dissipating just west of Cabo Corrientes, Mexico.

Tropical Depression Fourteen-E 

Tropical Depression Fourteen-E developed from a small swirl of low clouds that was first observed along the Intertropical Convergence Zone well to the south-southwest of Baja California on September 30. Little development occurred until October 3, when the system began to generate more persistent deep convection. Despite significant effects from wind shear, the depression was still forecast to intensify into a tropical storm. Later that day, the low-level center of the depression became more difficult to locate on satellite images, and the location of the poorly defined center was estimated. The remnant low cloud swirl continued westward for another 24–36 hours before dissipating completely.

Tropical Storm Manuel 

Tropical Storm Manuel formed from the remnants of Hurricane Iris from the Atlantic Basin. The core circulation of Iris had dissipated over the mountains of eastern Mexico, while new convection was developing a short distance away over the waters of the Pacific. However, the banding was short-lived, deep convection diminished, and satellite microwave imagery early on October 12 suggested that the circulation was becoming elongated. Wind shear returned, this time from the northwest, and Manuel turned to a west-southwesterly track and slowed. By October 12, Manuel had weakened to a tropical depression.

Manuel remained a disorganized depression for the next two and a half days. It continued moving to the west-southwest, but slowed to a drift as a mid-level ridge to the north of the cyclone gradually weakened. An upper-level trough dug southward to the west of Manuel early on October 15, and Manuel began to move to the north-northwest. By this point, water temperatures under the cyclone were decreasing and shear, this time from the southwest, was increasing. Manuel began to weaken while moving to the west-northwest and northwest. The remnant low moved slowly westward for a couple of days over cool waters before its circulation dissipated completely.

Hurricane Narda 

Narda developed from a westward moving tropical wave that crossed Dakar, Senegal around the October 3. The wave became convectively active after it crossed Central America when it produced a large burst of convection in the Bay of Campeche on the October 15. The southern portion of the wave continued westward over the Pacific waters south of Mexico and under favorable upper-level winds, it began to acquire banding features and several centers of circulation. The system finally consolidated and developed one center at October 20. Moving on a west-northwest track, it intensified and reached tropical storm status later that day. The cloud pattern continued to become better organized and visible satellite imagery showed an intermittent eye feature, and it is estimated that Narda became a hurricane at October 21. Narda peak's intensity of 980 mbar (hPa) occurred on October 22. Thereafter, a gradual weakening began and strong shear took a toll on Narda. The tropical cyclone became a tight swirl of low clouds with intermittent convection on October 24, as it moved westward steered by the low-level flow and crossing 140°W over the Central Pacific area of responsibility. It then continued westward as a tropical depression until dissipation.

Hurricane Octave 

The final tropical depression of the season likely developed from a weak tropical wave that moved westward across Central America on October 22. The depression was initially affected by easterly upper-level winds and outflow was restricted on the eastern quadrant. The depression intensified and was upgraded to Tropical Storm Octave six hours after forming. Although cloud tops warmed on October 31, Octave organized further, and the NHC noted that the storm began to resemble a hurricane early on November 1. Shortly thereafter, no significant intensification was predicted, as the cloud pattern was becoming elongated, vertical wind shear would soon increase, and Octave would soon entering a region of decreasing sea surface temperatures. However, Octave re-organized and an eye feature began developing later on November 1.

The storm was upgraded to a hurricane after a ragged eye developed and T-numbers reached 4.0 on the Dvorak Scale. Wind shear began to increase, while sea surface temperatures were decreasing, causing the low-level circulation to become gradually displaced from the associated deep convection. However, the storm remained a hurricane until 18:00 UTC on November 2. By early on November 3, only minimal deep convection was associated with Octave. The NHC downgraded the system to a tropical depression later that day.

Storm names 
The following names were used for named storms that formed in the northeast Pacific in 2001. The names not retired from this list were used again in the 2007 Pacific hurricane season. This is the same list used for the 1995 season except for Ivo, which replaced Ismael. A storm was named Ivo for the first time in 2001. Names that were not assigned are marked in gray.

For storms that form in the Central Pacific Hurricane Center's area of responsibility, encompassing the area between 140 degrees west and the International Date Line, all names are used in a series of four rotating lists. The next four names that were slated for use in 2001 are shown below, however none of them were used.

Retirement 

After the season had begun the names Adolph and Israel (the original replacement for Ismael) were retired for political considerations, after a row brewed over the use of their names. They were replaced with Alvin and Ivo for the 2007 season, though the latter was used for the first time during this season.

Season effects 
This is a table of all the storms that formed in the 2001 Pacific hurricane season. It includes their duration, names, intensities, areas affected, damages, and death totals. Deaths in parentheses are additional and indirect (an example of an indirect death would be a traffic accident), but were still related to that storm. Damage and deaths include totals while the storm was extratropical, a wave, or a low, and all the damage figures are in 2001 USD.

See also 

 Tropical cyclones in 2001
 List of Pacific hurricanes
 Pacific hurricane season
 2001 Atlantic hurricane season
 2001 Pacific typhoon season
 2001 North Indian Ocean cyclone season
 South-West Indian Ocean cyclone seasons: 2000–01, 2001–02
 Australian region cyclone seasons: 2000–01, 2001–02
 South Pacific cyclone seasons: 2000–01, 2001–02

References

External links 

 National Hurricane Center Website
 National Hurricane Center's Eastern Pacific Tropical Weather Outlook
 Servicio Meteorológico Nacional Website 
 Joint Typhoon Warning Center 
 NHC 2001 Pacific hurricane season archive
 HPC 2001 Tropical Cyclone Rainfall Pages
 Central Pacific Hurricane Center 
 Gary Padgett's monthly storm summaries and best tracks

 
2002
2001 EPac